North Carolina's 53rd House district is one of 120 districts in the North Carolina House of Representatives. It has been represented by Republican Howard Penny Jr. since 2020.

Geography
Since 2023, the district has included parts of Harnett and Johnston counties. The district overlaps with the 10th and 12th Senate districts.

District officeholders since 1995

Election results

2022

2020

2018

2016

2014

2012

2010

2008

2006

2004

2002

2000

References

North Carolina House districts
Harnett County, North Carolina
Johnston County, North Carolina